The Mégiscane Lake sits in the municipality of Senneterre (parish), in La Vallée-de-l'Or Regional County Municipality (RCM), in the administrative region of Abitibi-Témiscamingue, in Quebec, in Canada.

Geography

Toponymy 
The toponym "Mégiscane" is of Algonquin origin and refers to a river, a lake, a dam and a locality. This Algonquin term translates as fish hook or bait. Testimonies of the time reveal that the Algonquins were fishing at the line intensively on the Mégiscane River. This toponym includes several spellings according to the explorers' reports: Megiskan, Métiskan and Métiscan.

The toponym "Lac Mégiscane" was inscribed on December 5, 1968, at the Bank of Place Names of the Commission de toponymie du Québec.

Notes and references

See also 

Lakes of Abitibi-Témiscamingue
Nottaway River drainage basin
La Vallée-de-l’Or